Ahmed Goumane Roble (5 January 1923 – 20 February 2013) was a Djiboutian politician who was elected to the French Senate in 1958. He served for ten years in the French army, where he rose to the rank of master sergeant. His courage in combat earned him the combatant's medal and the 1939-1945 Croix de Guerre.

Returning to civilian life, he traded, while engaging in public life: elected to the Territorial Council, he became his vice-presidency.

During the election of 8 June 1958 to the Council of the Republic, he won the seat attributed to the French Somali Coast by beating, by 18 votes to 7 out of 31 cast, the outgoing Hassan Gouled, thanks to the support of the RDA of which he has the label.

Goumane-Roble died on 20 February 2013, at the age of 90.

References 

1923 births
2013 deaths
Djiboutian politicians
French Senators of the Fourth Republic
Senators of French East Africa